Margosatubig, officially the Municipality of Margosatubig (Subanen: Benwa Margosatubig; Chavacano: Municipalidad de Margosatubig), is a 3rd class municipality in the province of Zamboanga del Sur, Philippines. According to the 2020 census, it has a population of 38,660 people.

History

The Subanens were believed to be the first people to have settled in this land, right near the swift flowing river that now traverse the Margosatubig Pilot School and Guiwan district. “Malagus Tubig” was the original name of the town, which was taken after the swift river current that kept changing its course towards the mouth of the Dumanquilas Bay. In the 15th century, the Spaniards arrived and found that its bay is a natural refuge from bad weather for their ships. Soon it became their choice settlement changing Malagus Tubig (Marugusaig) to its present name Margosatubig. They built a huge stone fort on top of a hill that served as their bastion against Moro pirates who used to raid the settlements along the Dumanquillas Bay and its vicinity. The fort was known as Cotta Heights. In 1963, it was demolished and is now the site of Pax High School. The Spaniards reigned for years and left as their heritage most evidently, the Chavacano dialect. Suffice it to say that more than a hundred years ago, Margosatubig already existed as a settlement of migrants and natives in the 19th century.

From 1917 to 1936, Margosatubig stayed as a municipal district of the city of Zamboanga. During the Commonwealth Government and by virtue Executive Order No. 17 dated December 23, 1936 signed by President Manuel L. Quezon, Margosatubig finally became a regular and distinct municipality with eight original barrios. It can be said that Margosatubig is the oldest town in Zamboanga del Sur; older even than the undivided Province of Zamboanga.

In 1950, the barrios of Punta Flecha, Pitogo, Qugbay, Balong-balong, Libertad and Dumanguilas were transferred to the newly created town of Dimataling

In 1951, the barrios of Malangas, La Dicha, Diplo, Gusem, Buug, Matinaw, Gaulan, Tinungtungan, Manangon, Lindang, Luop, Silupa, Minsulao, Paruk, Lubing, Balabao, Mali, Baluran, Sampuli and Bacao, all from Margosatubig were separated to form the town of Malangas.

Margosatubig, in spite of being a pioneer town, still remained isolated and reachable only by sea craft. In 1976, it was finally opened to the rest of Zamboanga del Sur by an asphalt road connecting it to Pagadian. This was facilitated by the Zamboanga del Sur Development Project undertaken by the Philippine-Australian Development Assistance Programme (PADAP), and its Electrification by ZAMSURECO-1 followed in 1979.

Geography

Climate

Barangays

Margosatubig is politically subdivided into 17 barangays.

Demographics

Economy

References

External links

 Margosatubig Profile at PhilAtlas.com
 [ Philippine Standard Geographic Code]
Philippine Census Information

Municipalities of Zamboanga del Sur
Establishments by Philippine executive order